Turnip Boy Commits Tax Evasion is a 2021 action-adventure video game developed by Snoozy Kazoo and published by Graffiti Games. It was released for Linux, macOS, Windows, and Nintendo Switch in April 2021. The game was also released for Xbox One in April 2022, for iOS and Android in May 2022, and for PlayStation 4 in December 2022. The player is placed in the role of an anthropomorphic turnip who evades taxes in an effort to fight a corrupt vegetable government. A sequel, titled Turnip Boy Robs a Bank, is scheduled to release for Microsoft Windows and Xbox One in 2023.

Gameplay
The player controls Turnip Boy, who has been convicted of tax evasion, and must go on a quest to stop a corrupt mayor. The game is played from a top-down perspective, and features a variety of areas to explore. The controls are similar to roguelite games, with a basic health system and hack and slash combat. Turnip Boy has an inventory containing a variety of items, which can include quest items, tools, and weapons; and can equip one at a time. Equippable items can be used in any direction, and position is determined by player input, such as mouse position. Turnip Boy can engage in combat with various enemies, in which he has a limited amount of hearts, and dies upon losing them all, but will respawn at the last checkpoint. Boss battles typically consist of attacking the boss directly with a weapon or utilizing a gimmick commonly used in the area the boss was found. Defeating bosses grants important items that can unlock new areas.

Along his journey, Turnip Boy may complete various sidequests to gain items or obtain achievements. Various NPCs can be interacted with, often either providing said quests or adding to the game's overall narrative.

Plot
Turnip Boy, owner of a greenhouse, receives a tax bill from Mayor Onion, which he rips up. Mayor Onion accuses him of evading his taxes, and sends him on various errands as penance, during which Turnip Boy, with help by an avocado named Annie, discover the history of their world, which implies there was some sort of nuclear holocaust that killed all humans, and began mutating vegetables into sentient bipedal beings.

Once Turnip Boy completes all errands, Mayor Onion locks him out of the greenhouse; Old Man Lemon then tells turnip boy that Turnip Boy's father, Don Turnipchino, was once a mighty mafia crime boss, with Mayor Onion and Old Man Lemon being his associates. Old Man Lemon reveals to Turnip Boy that there's a secret underground base underneath the greenhouse, and allows Turnip Boy to sneak in. Turnip Boy confronts and defeats the corrupt Mayor Onion, and reclaims the deed for his greenhouse - which he then rips up.

Reception 

The game received "mixed" reviews, according to review aggregator Metacritic.

References

Further reading

External links 
 

2021 video games
Action-adventure games
MacOS games
Nintendo Switch games
Post-apocalyptic video games
Video games about nuclear war and weapons
Video games about plants
Video games developed in the United States
Video games set in New York (state)
Windows games
Xbox One games
Xbox Series X and Series S games